Ana María Godes (born 11 July 1968) is a Spanish table tennis player. She competed in the women's singles event at the 1992 Summer Olympics.

References

1968 births
Living people
Spanish female table tennis players
Olympic table tennis players of Spain
Table tennis players at the 1992 Summer Olympics
Sportspeople from Barcelona